In probability theory, conditional probability is a measure of the probability of an event occurring, given that another event (by assumption, presumption, assertion or evidence) has already occurred. This can also be understood as the fraction of probability B that intersects with A: . 

For example, the probability that any given person has a cough on any given day may be only 5%. But if we know or assume that the person is sick, then they are much more likely to be coughing. For example, the conditional probability that someone unwell (sick) is coughing might be 75%, in which case we would have that  = 5% and  = 75 %.

For example, if a person has dengue fever, the person might have a 90% chance of being tested as positive for the disease. Alternatively, if a person is tested as positive for dengue fever, they may have only a 15% chance of actually having this rare disease due to high false positive rates. In this case, the probability of the event  (having dengue) given that the event  (testing positive) has occurred is 15% or  = 15%. It should be apparent now that falsely equating the two probabilities can lead to various errors of reasoning, which is commonly seen through base rate fallacies.  

While conditional probabilities can provide extremely useful information, limited information is often supplied or at hand. Therefore, it can be useful to reverse or convert a conditional probability using Bayes' theorem: .  Another option is to display conditional probabilities in conditional probability table to illuminate the relationship between events.

Definition

Conditioning on an event

Kolmogorov definition 
A is assumed to be the set of all possible outcomes of an experiment or random trial that has a restricted or reduced sample space. The conditional probability can be found by the quotient of the probability of the joint intersection of events  and —the probability at which A and B occur together, although not necessarily occurring at the same time—and the probability of :

.

For a sample space consisting of equal likelihood outcomes, the probability of the event A is understood as the fraction of the number of outcomes in A to the number of all outcomes in the sample space. Then, this equation is understood as the fraction of the set  to the set B. Note that the above equation is a definition, not just a theoretical result.

As an axiom of probability 
Some authors, such as de Finetti, prefer to introduce conditional probability as an axiom of probability:

.

This equation for a conditional probability, although mathematically equivalent, may be intuitively easier to understand. It can be interpreted as "the probability of B occurring multiplied by the probability of A occurring, provided that B has occurred, is equal to the probability of the A and B occurrences together, although not necessarily occurring at the same time". Additionally, this may be preferred philosophically; under major probability interpretations, such as the subjective theory, conditional probability is considered a primitive entity.

Thus the equations can be combined to find a new representation of the :

As the probability of a conditional event 

Conditional probability can be defined as the probability of a conditional event . The Goodman–Nguyen–Van Fraassen conditional event can be defined as:

, where  and  represent states or elements of A  or B. 

It can be shown that

which meets the Kolmogorov definition of conditional probability.

Conditioning on an event of probability zero 
If , then according to the definition,  is undefined.

The case of greatest interest is that of a random variable , conditioned on a continuous random variable  resulting in a particular outcome . The event  has probability zero and, as such, cannot be conditioned on.

The event  will generally have nonzero probability and hence, can be conditioned on.
We can then take the limit

For example, if two continuous random variables  and  have a joint density , then by L'Hôpital's rule and Leibniz integral rule, upon differentiation with respect to :

The resulting limit is the conditional probability distribution of  given  and exists when the denominator, the probability density , is strictly positive.

It is tempting to define the undefined probability  using this limit, but this cannot be done in a consistent manner.

The Borel–Kolmogorov paradox demonstrates this with a geometrical argument.

Conditioning on a discrete random variable 

Let  be a discrete random variable and its possible outcomes denoted . For example, if  represents the value of a rolled die then  is the set . Let us assume for the sake of presentation that  is a discrete random variable, so that each value in  has a nonzero probability.

Writing

For a fixed , we can form the random variable .

The conditional probability of  given  can thus be treated as a random variable   with outcomes in the interval .

Partial conditional probability 

The partial conditional probability

is about the probability of event 
 given that each of the condition events
 has occurred to a degree
 (degree of belief, degree of experience) that might be different from 100%. Frequentistically, partial conditional probability makes sense, if the conditions are tested in experiment repetitions of appropriate length 
. Such 
-bounded partial conditional probability can be defined as the conditionally expected average occurrence of event
 in testbeds of length 
 that adhere to all of the probability specifications
, i.e.:

Based on that,  partial conditional probability can be defined as

where 

Jeffrey conditionalization
is a special case of partial conditional probability, in which the condition events must form a partition:

Example 
Suppose that somebody secretly rolls two fair six-sided dice, and we wish to compute the probability that the face-up value of the first one is 2, given the information that their sum is no greater than 5.
 Let D1 be the value rolled on die 1.
 Let D2 be the value rolled on die 2.

Probability that D1 = 2

Table 1 shows the sample space of 36 combinations of rolled values of the two dice, each of which occurs with probability 1/36, with the numbers displayed in the red and dark gray cells being D1 + D2.

D1 = 2 in exactly 6 of the 36 outcomes; thus P(D1 = 2) =  = :

{| class="wikitable" style="background:silver; text-align:center; width:300px"
|+ Table 1
! rowspan=2 colspan=2 | +
! colspan=6 | D2
|-
! scope="col" | 1
! scope="col" | 2
! scope="col" | 3
! scope="col" | 4
! scope="col" | 5
! scope="col" | 6
|-
! rowspan=6 scope="row" | D1
! scope="row" | 1
| 2 || 3 || 4 || 5 || 6 || 7
|- style="background: red;"
! scope="row" | 2
| 3 || 4 || 5 || 6 || 7 || 8
|-
! scope="row" | 3
| 4 || 5 || 6 || 7 || 8 || 9
|-
! scope="row" | 4
| 5 || 6 || 7 || 8 || 9 || 10
|-
! scope="row" | 5
| 6 || 7 || 8 || 9 || 10 || 11
|-
! scope="row" | 6
| 7 || 8 || 9 || 10 || 11 || 12
|}

Probability that D1 + D2 ≤ 5

Table 2 shows that D1 + D2 ≤ 5 for exactly 10 of the 36 outcomes, thus P(D1 + D2 ≤ 5) = :

{| class="wikitable" style="background:silver; text-align:center; width:300px"
|+ Table 2
! rowspan=2 colspan=2 | +
! colspan=6 | D2
|-
! scope="col" | 1
! scope="col" | 2
! scope="col" | 3
! scope="col" | 4
! scope="col" | 5
! scope="col" | 6
|-
! rowspan=6 scope="row" | D1
! 1
| style="background:red;" | 2 || style="background:red;" | 3 || style="background:red;" | 4 || style="background:red;" | 5 || 6 || 7
|-
! scope="row" | 2
| style="background:red;" | 3 || style="background:red;" | 4 || style="background:red;" | 5 || 6 || 7 || 8
|-
! scope="row" | 3
| style="background:red;" | 4 || style="background:red;" | 5 || 6 || 7 || 8 || 9
|-
! scope="row" | 4
| style="background:red;" | 5 || 6 || 7 || 8 || 9 || 10
|-
! scope="row" | 5
| 6 || 7 || 8 || 9 || 10 || 11
|- style="background: red;"
|-
! scope="row" | 6
| 7 || 8 || 9 || 10 || 11 || 12
|- style="background: red;"
|}

Probability that D1 = 2 given that D1 + D2 ≤ 5 

Table 3 shows that for 3 of these 10 outcomes, D1 = 2.

Thus, the conditional probability P(D1 = 2 | D1+D2 ≤ 5) =  = 0.3:

{| class="wikitable" style="text-align:center; width:300px"
|+ Table 3
! rowspan=2 colspan=2 | +
! colspan=6 | D2
|-
! scope="col" | 1
! scope="col" | 2
! scope="col" | 3
! scope="col" | 4
! scope="col" | 5
! scope="col" | 6
|-
! rowspan=6 scope="row" | D1
! 1
| style="background:silver;" | 2 || style="background:silver;" | 3 || style="background:silver;" | 4 || style="background:silver;" | 5 || 6 || 7
|-
! scope="row" | 2
| style="background:red;" | 3 || style="background:red;" | 4 || style="background:red;" | 5 || 6 || 7 || 8
|-
! scope="row" | 3
| style="background:silver;" | 4 || style="background:silver;" | 5 || 6 || 7 || 8 || 9
|-
! scope="row" | 4
| style="background:silver;" | 5 || 6 || 7 || 8 || 9 || 10
|-
! scope="row" | 5
| 6 || 7 || 8 || 9 || 10 || 11
|-
! scope="row" | 6
| 7 || 8 || 9 || 10 || 11 || 12
|}

Here, in the earlier notation for the definition of conditional probability, the conditioning event B is that D1 + D2 ≤ 5, and the event A is D1 = 2. We have  as seen in the table.

Use in inference 

In statistical inference, the conditional probability is an update of the probability of an event based on new information. The new information can be incorporated as follows:

 Let A, the event of interest, be in the sample space, say (X,P).
 The occurrence of the event A knowing that event B has or will have occurred,  means the occurrence of  A as it is restricted to B, i.e. .
 Without the knowledge of the occurrence of B, the information about the occurrence of A would simply be P(A)
 The probability of A knowing that event B has or will have occurred, will be the probability of  relative to P(B), the probability that B has occurred.
 This results in  whenever P(B) > 0 and 0 otherwise.

This approach results in a probability measure that is consistent with the original probability measure and satisfies all the Kolmogorov axioms.  This conditional probability measure also could have resulted by assuming that the relative magnitude of the probability of A with respect to X will be preserved with respect to B (cf. a Formal Derivation below).

The wording "evidence" or "information" is generally used in the Bayesian interpretation of probability. The conditioning event is interpreted as evidence for the conditioned event. That is, P(A) is the probability of A before accounting for evidence E, and P(A|E) is the probability of A after having accounted for evidence E or after having updated P(A). This is consistent with the frequentist interpretation, which is the first definition given above.

Example 
When Morse code is transmitted, there is a certain probability that the "dot" or "dash" that was received is erroneous. This is often taken as interference in the transmission of a message. Therefore, it is important to consider when sending a "dot", for example, the probability that a "dot" was received. If it is assumed that the probability that a dot is transmitted as a dash is 1/10, and that the probability that a dash is transmitted as a dot is likewise 1/10, then Bayes's rule can be used to calculate .     

    

    

     

Now,  can be calculated:

Statistical independence 

Events A and B are defined to be statistically independent if the probability of the intersection of A and B is equal to the product of the probabilities of A and B: 

If P(B) is not zero, then this is equivalent to the statement that

Similarly, if P(A) is not zero, then

is also equivalent. Although the derived forms may seem more intuitive, they are not the preferred definition as the conditional probabilities may be undefined, and the preferred definition is symmetrical in A and B. Independence does not refer to a disjoint event. 

It should also be noted that given the independent event pair [A B] and an event C, the pair is defined to be conditionally independent if the product holds true: 

This theorem could be useful in applications where multiple independent events are being observed. 

Independent events vs. mutually exclusive events

The concepts of mutually independent events and mutually exclusive events are separate and distinct. The following table contrasts results for the two cases (provided that the probability of the conditioning event is not zero).

In fact, mutually exclusive events cannot be statistically independent (unless both of them are impossible), since knowing that one occurs gives information about the other (in particular, that the latter will certainly not occur).

Common fallacies 
These fallacies should not be confused with Robert K. Shope's 1978 "conditional fallacy", which deals with counterfactual examples that beg the question.

Assuming conditional probability is of similar size to its inverse  

In general, it cannot be assumed that P(A|B) ≈ P(B|A). This can be an insidious error, even for those who are highly conversant with statistics. The relationship between P(A|B) and P(B|A) is given by Bayes' theorem:

That is, P(A|B) ≈ P(B|A) only if P(B)/P(A) ≈ 1, or equivalently, P(A) ≈ P(B).

Assuming marginal and conditional probabilities are of similar size  
In general, it cannot be assumed that P(A) ≈ P(A|B). These probabilities are linked through the law of total probability:

This fallacy may arise through selection bias. For example, in the context of a medical claim, let S be the event that a sequela (chronic disease) S occurs as a consequence of circumstance (acute condition) C. Let H be the event that an individual seeks medical help. Suppose that in most cases, C does not cause S (so that P(S) is low). Suppose also that medical attention is only sought if S has occurred due to C. From experience of patients, a doctor may therefore erroneously conclude that P(S) is high. The actual probability observed by the doctor is P(S|H).

Over- or under-weighting priors 
Not taking prior probability into account partially or completely is called base rate neglect. The reverse, insufficient adjustment from the prior probability is conservatism.

Formal derivation 
Formally, P(A | B) is defined as the probability of A according to a new probability function on the sample space, such that outcomes not in B have probability 0 and that it is consistent with all original probability measures.

Let Ω be a discrete sample space with elementary events {ω}, and let P be the probability measure with respect to the σ-algebra of Ω. Suppose we are told that the event B ⊆ Ω has occurred. A new probability distribution (denoted by the conditional notation) is to be assigned on {ω} to reflect this. All events that are not in B will have null probability in the new distribution. For events in B, two conditions must be met: the probability of B is one and the relative magnitudes of the probabilities must be preserved. The former is required by the axioms of probability, and the latter stems from the fact that the new probability measure has to be the analog of P in which the probability of B is one - and every event that is not in B, therefore, has a null probability. Hence, for some scale factor α, the new distribution must satisfy:

Substituting 1 and 2 into 3 to select α:

So the new probability distribution is

Now for a general event A,

See also 

 Bayes' theorem
 Bayesian epistemology
 Borel–Kolmogorov paradox
 Chain rule (probability)
 Class membership probabilities
 Conditional independence
 Conditional probability distribution
 Conditioning (probability)
 Joint probability distribution
 Monty Hall problem
 Pairwise independent distribution
 Posterior probability
 Regular conditional probability

References

External links

Visual explanation of conditional probability

 
Mathematical fallacies
Statistical ratios